The B.C. Rich Mockingbird is a solid body electric guitar manufactured by B.C. Rich in 1976.  There have been several variations on the Mockingbird model throughout the years. As of 2016, the current models are the Mk1, Mk3, Mk5, Mk7, Mk9 and Mk11.

Origins and history

The Mockingbird model was designed on a sketch by bassist Johnny "Go-Go" Kallas. According to Kallas, the "shorthorn" version of the guitar appeared in 1975. The Mockingbird was released in 1976, and was redesigned by Bernie Rico into the "longhorn" version in 1978, which is the better known version of the guitar.

The September 2010 issue of Guitar World ranked the Mockingbird as "the coolest guitar of all time", ahead of guitars such as the Gibson Les Paul and Fender Stratocaster.

Mockingbird users 

 Steve Steinman of Vampires Rock
 Joe Perry
 Dick Wagner one of the first to use the Mockingbird
 Slash (Seen in the Guns N' Roses "You Could Be Mine" music video from Terminator 2: Judgment Day)
 Dave Mustaine
 Lita Ford
 Eric Melvin
 Steve Hunter
 Nils Lofgren
 Chuck Schuldiner
 Josh Homme
 Mieszko Talarczyk of Nasum
 Jake Pitts 
 Kerry King of Slayer
 Mille Petrozza of Kreator
 Eric Griffin
 Trey Anastasio of Phish is playing a green acrylic Mockingbird as part of the band's Halloween 2021 Musical Costume. 
 Paolo Gregoletto of Trivium
 Rick Derringer
 John Konesky
 hide of X Japan
Vic DiCara
Sean Blosl of Sanctuary
 Gerard Way of My Chemical Romance
 Mikael Åkerfeldt of Opeth

See also 
 B.C. Rich Warlock
 Parker Fly

References

B.C. Rich electric guitars